Paul of Tammah (Coptic: Ⲁⲃⲃⲁ Ⲡⲁⲩⲗⲉ ⲡⲓⲣⲉⲙⲧⲁⲙⲙⲟϩ) (died October 17, 415 AD) was an Egyptian saint who lived in the fourth and fifth centuries AD. He is venerated as a saint in the Oriental Orthodox Churches.

Life
Paul of Tammah lived as a hermit in the mountain of Ansena (currently in the El Minya governorate of Egypt). He had a disciple named Ezekiel. Paul of Tammah is most known for spending his life in lengthy fasts and worship. The Coptic Orthodox tradition has it that he would only break his fasts when Jesus told him to. He is credited to have written a number of ascetical texts. Towards the end of his life, he befriended Pishoy at the time when the latter fled the Nitrian Desert because of the Berbers' attacks, and went to dwell in the mountain of Ansena.

Departure and Relics
Paul of Tammah departed on 7 Paopi (October 17, 415 AD). He was buried along with Pishoy in the Monastery of Saint Pishoy at Deir El Barsha, which still exists today near Mallawi. On 4 Koiak 557 AM (December 13, 841 AD), Pope Joseph I fulfilled the desire of Pishoy and moved his body as well as that of Paul of Tammah to the Monastery of Saint Pishoy in the wilderness of Scetes. It is said that they first attempted to move the body of Pishoy only, but when they carried it to the boat on the Nile, the boat would not move until they brought in the body of Paul of Tammah as well. Today, the two bodies lie in the main church of the Coptic Orthodox Monastery of Saint Pishoy in the Nitrian Desert.

References

Coptic Orthodox Church Synaxarium (Book of Saints)

4th-century births
415 deaths
Saints from Roman Egypt
Egyptian hermits
Egyptian Christian monks
4th-century Christian saints